Arnold Lake is a small lake located west-northwest of the Village of Milford in the Town of Hartwick in Otsego County, New York. The lake drains south via Spring Brook which flows into Goodyear Lake by Portlandville.

References 

Lakes of New York (state)
Lakes of Otsego County, New York